Harlow is a fictionalized 1965 Electronovision drama film based on the life of screen star Jean Harlow (Carol Lynley) and directed by Alex Segal. It was Ginger Rogers' final film role.

The film was produced by Electronovision, Inc. and distributed by Magna Distribution Corporation, both of which would be defunct within a year after the film's release.

Paramount Pictures released a film also entitled Harlow just five weeks after Magna's release.

Plot
Noticing Jean Harlow in the background of a Laurel and Hardy film, actor Marc Peters tips off studio mogul Jonathan Martin, who arranges a screen test. Harlow becomes an overnight success. She is not a trained actor and is mocked by experienced actor William Mansfield, but her sex appeal makes her a Hollywood star.

Harlow's mother Mama Jean quickly capitalizes on her daughter's money and fame. Family and studio demands unnerve Harlow, as does her impulsive wedding to the impotent and suicidal Paul Bern. Harlow has many unhappy affairs and becomes depressed. But veteran actress Marie Dressler persuades her to take her profession more seriously, so Harlow goes back East to study her craft. When she returns home, Hollywood mogul Louis B. Mayer is impressed, as is Mansfield, who falls in love with her. However, Harlow dies in 1937.

Cast
Carol Lynley as Jean Harlow
Efrem Zimbalist Jr. as William Mansfield
Ginger Rogers as Mama Jean Bello
Barry Sullivan as Marino Bello
Hurd Hatfield as Paul Bern
Lloyd Bochner as Marc Peters
Hermione Baddeley as Marie Dressler
Audrey Totter as Marilyn
John Williams as Jonathan Martin
Audrey Christie as Thelma
Michael Dante as Ed
Jack Kruschen as Louis B. Mayer
Celia Lovsky as Maria Ouspenskaya
Robert Strauss as Hank
Sonny Liston as First Fighter

Production 
Judy Garland was originally cast in Rogers' role but left the film after just four days of shooting.

The film was directed by television veteran Alex Segal and shot in the black-and-white Electronovision process, in which action was recorded on a videotape master that would later be transferred to film via kinescope for theatrical release. The film was produced by Electronovision, Inc., owners of the Electronovision process, and distributed by Magna Distribution Corporation.

Electronovision, Inc. was in such financial distress during the making of Harlow that actors' paychecks bounced and the Screen Actors Guild canceled its contracts with the company. According to producer Bill Sargent, the film from two days of shooting was mysteriously lost, the cast was not afforded sufficient time to rehearse and great difficulty was encountered when trying to find a laboratory to process the film's prints as well as suitable theaters for showings.

Reception 
In a contemporary review for The New York Times, critic Howard Thompson called the film "cheap, lusterless and excruciatingly dull" and a "bony, bargain-basement appraisal of famous, misguided and tragic young woman."

Harlow grossed approximately $2 million, but Electronovision, Inc. did not realize a profit after shares were paid to the film's distributors and investors, including actor Richard Burton.

Paramount film
Harlow was released just five weeks before Paramount's film and with a more limited release. Though Carol Lynley was closer to Jean Harlow's actual age than was Paramount's star Carroll Baker, the film failed to gain as much attention as did Paramount's big-budget version.

Efrem Zimbalist, Jr.'s character William Mansfield is based on William Powell, but the character does not appear in the Paramount feature.

Magna Pictures Corporation brought a $25.2 million (later reduced to $6.3 million) antitrust lawsuit against Paramount, alleging that Paramount had engaged in a nationwide campaign to boycott Magna's film. Paramount filed a counterclaim alleging unfair competition by Magna and Electronovision. Electronovision, Inc. folded just two months after the premiere of Harlow, and Magna was dissolved in 1966.

Ironically, Electronovision/Magna's Harlow premiered at New York's Paramount Theatre, although the theater was no longer owned by Paramount at the time.

See also
List of American films of 1965

References

External links
 
 
 

1965 films
1960s biographical drama films
American biographical drama films
American black-and-white films
Biographical films about actors
Films directed by Alex Segal
Films scored by Nelson Riddle
Films set in the 1920s
Films set in the 1930s
1965 drama films
1960s English-language films
1960s American films